The Elder Scrolls Online, abbreviated ESO, is a massively multiplayer online role-playing game (MMORPG) developed by ZeniMax Online Studios and published by Bethesda Softworks. It was released for Windows and macOS in April 2014. It is a part of the Elder Scrolls series.

The game is set in the continent of Tamriel and features a storyline indirectly connected with the other games in the Elder Scrolls franchise. It had been in development for seven years before its release in 2014, with a mandatory monthly subscription model. It initially received mixed reviews.

Reception improved significantly with the March 2015 re-release and rebranding as The Elder Scrolls Online: Tamriel Unlimited, transitioning to a buy-to-play model with microtransactions and an optional subscription. It was released for the PlayStation 4 and Xbox One consoles in June 2015, and for PlayStation 5 and Xbox Series X/S in June 2021. More than 18 million copies were sold by 2021, having around 2.5 million monthly active players in 2017.

Gameplay
Gameplay is mostly non-linear, with a mixture of quests, random events, and free-roaming exploration of the world. It does not provide a mode for single-player offline play, although the developers stated that there would be "plenty of content" for online solo play.

The player chooses between ten different races:

 Humans: Nords, Redguards, Bretons, and (with separate purchase) Imperials
 Elvish races: Dunmer (Dark Elves), Altmer (High Elves), Bosmer (Wood Elves), and Orsimer (Orcs)
 Bestial races: Khajiit and Argonians

Players choose one of six classes when creating a character: Dragonknight, Sorcerer, Nightblade, Templar, Warden, or Necromancer. Each class gives the player various different attacks, spells, and passive effects. The game has other character choices beyond those of race and class, such as the player character also being able to become either a vampire or a werewolf, each of which grants its own skill tree. There are seven different crafting skill lines: Alchemy, Blacksmithing, Clothier, Enchanting, Woodworking, Provisioning, and Jewelry Crafting.

Setting

The game is set on the continent of Tamriel during the Second Era, but not all places in Tamriel are playable. The events of the game occur a millennium before those of The Elder Scrolls V: Skyrim and around 800 years before The Elder Scrolls III: Morrowind and The Elder Scrolls IV: Oblivion. Its structure is broadly similar to Skyrim, with two separate conflicts progressing at the same time, one with the fate of the world in the balance, and one where the prize is supreme power on Tamriel. In The Elder Scrolls Online, the first struggle is against the Daedric Prince Molag Bal, who is attempting to meld the plane of Mundus with his realm of Coldharbour, and the second is to capture the vacant imperial throne, contested by three alliances of the mortal races. The player character has been sacrificed to Molag Bal, and Molag Bal has stolen their soul, the recovery of which is the primary game objective.

Many parts of the continent of Tamriel are available in the game, with most zones accessible regardless of faction or player level. Some zones are accessible only from DLC which can be either purchased from the Crown Store, or is available for free as part of the ESO Plus subscription service. Players have the opportunity to join any of the three factions warring over the Ruby Throne of the Emperor of Tamriel: the First Aldmeri Dominion (represented by an eagle) led by Queen Ayrenn, composed of the Altmer (High Elf), Bosmer (Wood Elf), and Khajiit races; the Daggerfall Covenant (represented by a lion) led by High King Emeric, composed of the Bretons, Redguard, and Orsimer (Orcs); and the Ebonheart Pact (represented by a dragon) led by Jorunn Skald-King, composed of the Nord, Dunmer (Dark Elf), and Argonian races. Players may also unlock the Imperial race by purchasing the Digital Imperial Edition Upgrade in the Crown Store, which may be a part of any of the three factions. The other major ruling faction of Tamriel is the Empire, led by Empress Regent Clivia Tharn, which has fallen into instability and disrepair and serves as a non-joinable faction. Pre-ordered copies of the game included the "Explorers' Pack" which allowed all races to be played in each of the factions, and this feature is also available in the Crown Store.

The game begins in the Wailing Prison in Coldharbour, where the player character's soulless husk (known as a soul shriven) has been enslaved. This opening continues another Elder Scrolls tradition of beginning the game with the player as a prisoner. After escaping, the base of operations becomes the Harborage, a cave found at each of the starting cities where the Prophet opens portals to the locations of the main questline. Once the Amulet of Kings is retrieved, the headquarters shift to the Hollow City, a location in central Coldharbour blessed by Meridia. Civilians saved from Coldharbour's prisons arrive in the Hollow City, and it is from there that attacks are orchestrated on Molag Bal's controlled areas.

Development
The Elder Scrolls Online had been in development for seven years before its release in 2014. It is the first project for ZeniMax Online Studios, which was formed in 2007. Matt Firor, studio lead at ZeniMax Online, is the director of The Elder Scrolls Online. ZeniMax Online licensed the HeroEngine in November 2007. It was used as a whiteboard for the game in early development while the production engine was in development. The game was funded by Providence Equity Partners and reinvested profits from the success of The Elder Scrolls IV: Oblivion.

Rumors of a massively multiplayer The Elder Scrolls game had been circulating for years, first prompted by a domain registration by ZeniMax Media in November 2007 for ElderScrollsOnline.com. Information about the game and its imminent May 2012 announcement was leaked in March 2012, to online publication Tom's Guide by an anonymous industry source. According to the leak, the game was scheduled to be shown at E3 2012 in June and QuakeCon 2012 in August. On November 8, 2012, Bethesda released a video on YouTube called "An Introduction to The Elder Scrolls Online", in which the game's developers talk about the game's content and development. Several actors were announced to voice the characters of The Elder Scrolls Online, including John Cleese, Bill Nighy, Kate Beckinsale, Lynda Carter, Alfred Molina, Michael Gambon, Jennifer Hale, Malcolm McDowell, and Peter Stormare. Beta sign-ups for The Elder Scrolls Online began on January 21, 2013, and continued for seven rounds until February 26.

In June 2013, Sony announced that The Elder Scrolls Online would be available on PlayStation 4 at its E3 press conference. Bethesda later clarified availability on Xbox One. Crossplatform play was on Windows and Mac, and not Xbox One and PlayStation 4. In August 2013, at Gamescom, it was announced that The Elder Scrolls Online would have a monthly subscription fee upon release for all platforms. Subscriptions could be purchased in 30-, 90-, and 180-day increments. It was announced in January 2014 that the game would not require a PlayStation Plus subscription to play online, and the Xbox One version would require an Xbox Live Gold subscription in addition to a The Elder Scrolls Online monthly subscription. On May 8, 2014, Bethesda spoke about development of the console editions, announcing that the release date for the PlayStation 4 and Xbox One versions of the game would be delayed until the end of 2014, though it was revealed in December 2014 that the game's console debut was once again delayed into early 2015. ZeniMax Online Studios announced that players who purchased The Elder Scrolls Online before the end of June 2014 would have the opportunity to transfer their characters from Windows or Mac OS to either console platform and receive a free 30-day subscription.

Releases

Original release
The Elder Scrolls Online was announced on May 3, 2012, on the Game Informer website and in that same month's issue of the magazine. It was released on April 4, 2014, for Windows and Mac. Home console releases for the PlayStation 4 and Xbox One were released on June 9, 2015. The game was later ported over to Stadia on June 16, 2020.

Shortly after launch, some players reportedly were unable to activate the 30-day complimentary game time without a subscription and—in "a strange state of affairs" and "most likely a mistake"—after a full month had been paid for. A serious item duplication exploit was discovered that allowed players to gain huge fortunes, which was patched shortly after release. ZeniMax later announced that they had permanently banned thousands of accounts because of the exploit.

Tamriel Unlimited
A subscription is no longer needed to play the game since March 17, 2015. Aside from the initial game price, an optional subscription called "ESO Plus" grants access to all current and future downloadable content (DLC) and a monthly allotment of 1650 Crowns, one of the in-game currencies, requiring subscription which also grants perks of 10% faster progress than a free player.

Gold Edition
On July 6, 2016, ZeniMax announced Elder Scrolls Online: Gold Edition for September 9, 2016. It includes the base game, a certain vanity item, and the four major DLCs: Imperial City, Orsinium, Thieves Guild, and Dark Brotherhood. ZeniMax released the "Guilds and Glory" DLC pack for users who already own the base game.

Expansions and updates

Chapters and DLCs

Morrowind
On January 31, 2017, ZeniMax announced a full expansion pack based in Vvardenfell, the setting originally playable in The Elder Scrolls III: Morrowind. Unlike previous DLC, initially Morrowind was sold separately and with crown points. It includes a new class, a new trial, and a new player vs. player mode called "Battlegrounds". It was released on June 6, 2017. However, Morrowind was introduced to the Crown Store by Bethesda during the 2018 June/July sale and is now included with the base game.

Summerset
On March 21, 2018, ZeniMax announced a full expansion pack based on Summerset Isle, a setting that had not been playable since The Elder Scrolls: Arena. Sold separately, it includes a new zone, new story line, jewelry crafting, and a new skill line based on the Psijic Order. A new trial, Cloudrest, was launched. The expansion was released on May 21, 2018 for Windows and OS X and was released on June 5, 2018 for PlayStation 4 and Xbox One.

Elsweyr
On January 15, 2019, ZeniMax announced a full expansion pack based in Elsweyr, a setting that has not been playable since The Elder Scrolls: Arena. It introduced a necromancer class, a story line involving dragons. A new trial, Sunspire, was launched. The expansion pack was released on June 4 for all platforms.

Greymoor
On January 16, 2020, ZeniMax announced a full expansion pack based in Skyrim. The expansion introduced a new zone to explore, Western Skyrim; a new system called Antiquities, a storyline involving vampires and a new 12-Person Trial called Kyne's Aegis was also launched. The expansion was released on May 26, 2020 for Windows and OS X, and on June 10 for PlayStation 4 and Xbox One.

Blackwood

On January 26, 2021, ZeniMax announced a full expansion pack based in an area encompassing both Cyrodiil and Black Marsh. The story surrounds the Daedric Prince Mehrunes Dagon's nefarious plans for Tamriel. The expansion introduced a new zone to explore, Blackwood, along with a new Companions system and Trial; Rockgrove. The expansion was released on June 1, 2021 for PC and June 8, 2021 for consoles.

High Isle

On January 27, 2022, ZeniMax announced a full expansion pack based around the Systres archipelago, located in the seas far to the west of Tamriel. It is a region that has never appeared in the series before. The expansion's story centers around an attempt by the three warring alliances to negotiate an end to the conflict in secret while being plotted against by a group known as the Ascendant Order. The expansion will introduce two new zones to explore, the eponymous High Isle and another island called Amenos, as well as a new card-based minigame called Tales of Tribute, a new Trial called Dreadsail Reef, and two new companions. The expansion was released on June 6, 2022 for Mac/PC and June 21, 2022 for consoles.

Other downloadable content

PvPvE content

The Imperial City
On June 14, 2015, at the Bethesda showcase at E3, downloadable content (DLC) was announced for the Imperial City, the Capital of Cyrodiil. It was released for Windows and OS X on August 31, 2015, for the Xbox One on September 15, and for the PlayStation 4 on September 16. It introduced a new currency known as Tel Var Stones, a vast sewer system running throughout the city that adds a unique close-quarter PvP experience, and added the game's largest dungeon at that time, The Imperial City Prison. The city itself is overrun by the forces of Daedric Prince Molag Bal, with every district and the central White-Gold Tower being merged into his realm.

Zone Update

Orsinium
At the E3 showcase, the new zone of Wrothgar was announced in a DLC called Orsinium, the capital of the Orsimer, better known as Orcs. The DLC was released in November 2015, and introduces a solo challenge known as the Maelstrom Arena. The questline involves assisting the Orcish King Kurog with rebuilding the city of Orsinium.

Thieves Guild
The Thieves Guild DLC was revealed by ZeniMax in a livestream to be set in a new area, Abah's Landing in Hammerfell, featuring an all new quest line and new game mechanics. The DLC was released in March 2016.

Dark Brotherhood
The 2015 E3 trailer ended with a note with a black hand on it that states, "We Know", a reference to a Dark Brotherhood guild in previous The Elder Scrolls games. The Dark Brotherhood DLC takes place on the Gold Coast of Cyrodiil, and introduces new story content and gameplay mechanics. It was released on May 31, 2016, for Windows, and on June 14, 2016, for PlayStation 4 and Xbox One. It was made available on the Public Test Server on April 25, 2016. In addition to the Dark Brotherhood questline, the release of the expansion saw the removal of the Veteran Progression System, a new system of poison crafting, and quality of life changes for The Elder Scrolls Online Plus subscribers, including "craft bags", which allow subscribers to store crafting materials without taking up space in their inventory.

Clockwork City
Announced along with Horns of the Reach on June 12, 2017, Clockwork City was eventually released on October 23 for Windows and Mac and November 11 for Xbox One and PlayStation 4. This DLC takes players to a new zone, a realm of brass and artificial life forms. The Clockwork City is the domain of Sotha Sil.

Markarth
Markarth was released on November 2, 2020 for Windows, Mac, and Stadia and November 10, 2020 for Xbox One and PS4. It brings the year-long Dark Heart of Skyrim story line to an end with the introduction of The Reach zone, has a new solo arena, and has a new item collection system.

Murkmire
Murkmire was released in late October, 2018, and concerns a previously unexplored region of Black Marsh, where the story is about a dead clan of Argonians.

The Deadlands
The Deadlands, released on November 1, 2021, concluded the Gates of Oblivion storyline with the introduction of the Deadlands zone.

Dungeon updates

Shadows of the Hist
Director Matt Firor said that the last DLC for 2016 would be Argonian-themed. Further information was later released, including the title Shadows of the Hist. The DLC includes two new dungeons: the Cradle of Shadows and Ruins of Mazzatun, and was released in August 2016.

Horns of the Reach 
Horns of the Reach was announced on June 12, 2017. The DLC includes two new dungeons, Bloodroot Forge and Falkreath Hold, and was released on August 14, 2017 on Windows and Mac, and on consoles on August 25.

Dragon Bones
Dragon Bones is a dungeon pack and includes two new dungeons - "Fang Lair" and "Scalecaller Peak". Both include cabals of necromancers, an undead dragon raised by their leader, and an awakened Dragon Priest intending to release a deadly plague. The pack was released for Windows on February 12, 2018, and on consoles on February 27.

Wolfhunter
Wolfhunter is a dungeon pack announced on June 10, 2018 and released on August 13 for Windows and Mac and released on August 28 for Xbox One and PlayStation 4. It includes two dungeons, "Moon Hunter Keep" and "March of Sacrifices", both centered around werewolves.

Wrathstone
Wrathstone is about getting two parts of a mysterious tablet. It was announced on January 15, 2019 and was released on Windows and Mac on February 25, 2019 and for PS4 and Xbox One on March 12, 2019.

Dragonhold
Dragonhold brings the year-long Season of the Dragon storyline to a conclusion with content including a new zone, quests, rewards, and challenges. It was released on Windows and Mac on October 21, 2019.

Harrowstorm
Harrowstorm was released on February 24, 2020 for Windows and Mac and March 10, 2020 for Xbox One and PS4. It includes two dungeons, "Icereach" and "Unhallowed Grave", which introduce the story line of the Dark Heart of Skyrim.

Stonethorn
Stonethorn was released on August 24, 2020 for Windows, Mac, and Stadia and September 1, 2020 for Xbox One and PS4. It includes two dungeons, "Castle Thorn" and "Stone Garden", which continue the Dark Heart of Skyrim storyline.

Flames of Ambition
Flames of Ambition was released on March 8, 2021 for Windows, Mac, and Stadia and March 16, 2021 for Xbox One and PS4. It includes two dungeons, "Black Drake Villa" and "The Cauldron" which begins The Gates of Oblivion story line, which is planned to be continued in the Blackwood chapter.

Waking Flame
Waking Flame is a dungeon DLC released on August 23, 2021, which will continue the Gates of Oblivion storyline following the Blackwood Chapter.

Content updates

One Tamriel
In June 2016, a new content update, titled One Tamriel, was announced. The update changed the core gameplay to allow players to play quests, explore areas, and group up with others without previously implemented restrictions. The update was released in October 2016.

Homestead
In October 2016, Firor announced that player housing would be coming to the game in 2017. It was released on February 6, 2017, as part of update 13. There are over 40 different types of houses available; homes are styled after the game's ten playable races, and they come in furnished or unfurnished versions, which can be bought using in-game gold or with real money using crowns.

Champion system redesign
In March 2021, a major change called Update 29 was released. It significantly altered the late game advancement system called Champion Points. It expanded the cap from 810 to 3,600 Champion Points. Numerous changes were made to equipment and skills.

Reception

Original release
The Elder Scrolls Online initially received mixed reviews; the game has a weighted aggregate rating of 71/100 on Metacritic based on 64 reviews. PC Gamer gave it a score of 68/100, writing that it is "an MMORPG of moderate scope with a few good ideas" but cautioning that "'okay' isn't good enough when you're facing down this much of a premium."

ZeniMax addressed many of the game's early criticisms and released major updates. In January 2015, they announced that the game would no longer be using a subscription model, becoming effective March 17, 2015. ZeniMax also announced that it would be coming to PlayStation 4 and Xbox One on June 9, 2015, and that it would be rebranded as The Elder Scrolls Online: Tamriel Unlimited.

Summerset won the award for "Outstanding Video Game" at the 30th GLAAD Media Awards. The game was nominated for the "Still Playing" award at the 2019 Golden Joystick Awards, and Elsweyr was nominated for the "Best Game Expansion" award.

Tamriel Unlimited
Tamriel Unlimited received mostly positive reviews. The PlayStation 4 version has a weighted aggregate rating of 74/100 on Metacritic based on 30 reviews, the Windows version has 80/100 based on 4 reviews, and the Xbox One version received 77/100 based on 11 reviews. Eurogamers Dan Whitehead reviewed the game, saying that "For fans eager for a new fix all these years on from Skyrim, that may well be enough. The ability to share the adventure, somewhat clumsily, with friends is both a selling point and a pitfall, but those who concentrate their efforts on the Alliance War will find the experience worthwhile."

Sales and user base
The Elder Scrolls Online was the top-selling game in the United Kingdom for the week of April 5, 2014, for individual formats, and number two across all formats. When the game was released on consoles, the game once again became the top-selling game in the United Kingdom for the week of June 15, 2015, across all formats, becoming the year's second best-selling game at retail. The game was ranked the best-selling downloadable PlayStation 4 game of June 2015 in the United States and Europe. In the United States, it was the second and sixth best-selling game of June and July 2015, respectively.

In February 2017, it was announced that the game had surpassed over 8.5 million in retail sales having around one million monthly active players. In June 2017, it was announced the game had more than 10 million players since release, and around 2.5 million monthly active players. In June 2019, it was announced that the game reached 13.5 million players lifetime. As of January 2020, more than 15 million copies had been sold. Pete Hines called The Elder Scrolls Online the most successful Bethesda game from 2017 to 2021.

Accolades
The Elder Scrolls Online was nominated for Evolving Game at the 19th British Academy Games Awards in 2023.

Notes

References

External links
 

2014 video games
Active massively multiplayer online games
Bethesda Softworks games
Fantasy massively multiplayer online role-playing games
Lua (programming language)-scripted video games
MacOS games
Massively multiplayer online role-playing games
Open-world video games
PlayStation 4 games
PlayStation 4 Pro enhanced games
Stadia games
Online, The Elder Scrolls
Video games scored by Jeremy Soule
Video games developed in the United States
Video games using Havok
Windows games
Xbox Cloud Gaming games
Xbox One games
PlayStation 5 games
Xbox Series X and Series S games
Video games about dragons